Wola Prosperowa  is a village in the administrative district of Gmina Oporów, within Kutno County, Łódź Voivodeship, in central Poland.

References

Wola Prosperowa